Dmytro Valeryovych Yakovenko (born 17 September 1992) is a Ukrainian high jumper. A member of Ukraine's track and field squad at the 2015 IAAF World Championships and 2016 Summer Olympics, Yakovenko managed to clear his outdoor best jump of 2.30 m at the 2015 Ukraine Team Championships in Kirovohrad.
 
At the 2016 Summer Olympics in Rio de Janeiro, Yakovenko competed for Ukraine, along with his fellow countrymen Andriy Protsenko and eventual bronze medalist and current European record holder Bohdan Bondarenko, in the men's high jump. Leading up to his maiden Games, Yakovenko jumped a height of 2.30 metres to attain both his personal best and the IAAF Olympic entry standard at the 2015 Ukraine Team Championships. During the qualifying phase, Yakovenko elected to pass 2.17 and 2.22 and then successfully cleared a season best of 2.26 m on his second attempt. Unable to trump the mandatory 2.29-metre barrier after three successive attempts, Yakovenko finished twentieth from a field of 43 high jumpers.

Competition record

References

External links
 

Ukrainian male high jumpers
Living people
Sportspeople from Kropyvnytskyi
1992 births
World Athletics Championships athletes for Ukraine
Athletes (track and field) at the 2016 Summer Olympics
Olympic athletes of Ukraine